Silopi Asphaltite Mine is an asphaltite mine located in Şırnak Province in Turkey which supplies fuel for Şırnak Silopi power station.

References

External links 

 coal mines in Turkey on Global Energy Monitor

Coal mines in Turkey
Şırnak Province
Asphalt